Harrisville Township is a civil township of Alcona County in the U.S. state of Michigan. The population was 1,348 at the 2010 census.  Harrisville Township surrounds the city of Harrisville, but the two are administered autonomously.

Communities
The Holden family settled in the area after their boat blew ashore in 1846. In 1865, the community grew when Joseph Van Buskirk built a store and mill. It was first called Sunflower Hill but was also referred to as South Harrisville due to its proximity to Harrisville. It was later known as Springport due to the numerous coldsprings in the area.

Geography

Harrisville Township has a coastline along Lake Huron, and most of Harrisville State Park is located within the township and extends into the city of Harrisville.

Major highways
 runs along the eastern portion of the township near Lake Huron.
 runs west–east through the center of the township into the city of Harrisville.

Demographics

As of the census of 2000, there were 1,411 people, 555 households, and 405 families residing in the township. The racial makeup of the township was 98.72% White, 0.35% Native American, and 0.92% from two or more races. Hispanic or Latino of any race were 0.64% of the population.

There were 555 households, out of which 25.0% had children under the age of 18 living with them, 62.2% were married couples living together, 6.8% had a female householder with no husband present, and 27.0% were non-families. 22.5% of all households were made up of individuals, and 11.4% had someone living alone who was 65 years of age or older.  The average household size was 2.37 and the average family size was 2.74.

In the township the population was spread out, with 20.4% under the age of 18, 6.0% from 18 to 24, 20.8% from 25 to 44, 28.6% from 45 to 64, and 24.2% who were 65 years of age or older.  The median age was 47 years. For every 100 females, there were 90.7 males.  For every 100 females age 18 and over, there were 91.3 males.

The median income for a household in the township was $35,074, and the median income for a family was $36,685. Males had a median income of $28,500 versus $20,588 for females. The per capita income for the township was $15,907.  About 7.8% of families and 9.9% of the population were below the poverty line, including 10.8% of those under age 18 and 6.9% of those age 65 or over.

Education
Harrisville Township is served entirely by Alcona Community Schools.

References

External links
 Harrisville Township official website

Townships in Alcona County, Michigan
Townships in Michigan
Populated places on Lake Huron in the United States
Populated places established in 1859
1859 establishments in Michigan